Lee Cheol-joo (born 12 August 1986), better known by his stage name Basick (Hangul: 베이식), is a South Korean rapper under OUTLIVE. He won the fourth season of Mnet's rap competition Show Me the Money.

Biography
Basick was born on August 12, 1986 in Daegu, . He is fluent in English, having majored in marketing at Babson College in the United States. Basick is married to Yoo Seo-yeon and they welcomed their first child, Lee Chaeha, in 2015.

Career
Basick first appeared in the Korean underground hip hop scene in 2007 and was recruited as a member of South Korea's largest hip hop crew Jiggy Fellaz in 2008. In 2009, Basick became one half of the duo Double Trouble with fellow Jiggy Fellaz crew member, Innovator. Mid-2013, he began a hiatus in the music scene after getting married and started a career inside a sports fashion brand.

In 2015, Basick participated in the fourth season of rap competition Show Me The Money, going on to win the series overall as part of team "Brand New" with Verbal Jint and San E of Brand New Music. Basick is now signed under Rainbow Bridge World and have featured in a number of collaborations. In 2016, he released his first mini album titled Nice.

Discography

Studio albums

Extended plays

Singles

Filmography

Television

Notes

References

1986 births
Living people
South Korean male rappers
Show Me the Money (South Korean TV series) contestants
People from Daegu